Yama-no-Kami (山の神) is the name given to a kami of the mountains of the Shinto religion of Japan. These can be of two different types.  The first type is a god of the mountains who is worshipped by hunters, woodcutters, and charcoal burners.  The second is a god of agriculture who comes down from the mountains and is worshipped by farmers. This kami is generally considered as a goddess, or a female deity.

Yama-no-Kami appearing in Japanese mythology include:

Ōyamatsumi (大山津見神), the father of Konohanasakuya-hime.
Masaka-Yamatsumi (正鹿山津見神)
Odo-Yamatsumi (淤縢山津見神)
Oku-Yamatsumi (奥山津見神)
Kura-Yamatsumi (闇山津見神)
Shigi-Yamatsumi (志藝山津見神)
Ha-Yamatsumi (羽山津見神)
Hara-Yamatsumi (原山津見神)
To-Yamatsumi (戸山津見神)
Konohanasakuya-hime (木花之開耶姫), the wife of Ninigi-no-Mikoto and great-grandmother of Emperor Jimmu.
Ohoyamakui (大山咋神), the god of Mount Hiei.
Shirayama-hime (白山比咩神), the goddess of Mount Hakusan.

See also
 Sansin
 Xian (Taoism)

Japanese deities
Japanese folk religion
Nature deities
Shinto kami
Mountain gods